Texcoco or Tezcoco may refer to:

Mexico
 Texcoco (altepetl), the pre-Columbian Mesoamerican city-state and founder of the Aztec Triple Alliance
 Texcoco, State of Mexico, the modern-day Mexican municipality, which includes the city of Texcoco de Mora
 Lake Texcoco, a former lake in the Valley of Mexico

U.S.A.
Tezcuco (Burnside, Louisiana) plantation, listed on the NRHP in Ascension Parish, Louisiana